Sverre Hansen (23 June 1913 – 22 August 1974) was a Norwegian football player who competed in the Olympic games in 1936. He was born in Larvik. He was a member of the national team that won the bronze medal in Berlin. He earned 15 caps and scored 7 goals for the Norway national football team from 1933 to 1936.

References

1913 births
1974 deaths
Footballers at the 1936 Summer Olympics
Olympic bronze medalists for Norway
Olympic footballers of Norway
Norwegian footballers
Norway international footballers
1938 FIFA World Cup players
Olympic medalists in football
Medalists at the 1936 Summer Olympics
Association football midfielders
People from Larvik
Sportspeople from Vestfold og Telemark